The eleventh edition of the Johan Cruyff Shield was held on 13 August 2006 between 2005–06 Eredivisie champions PSV Eindhoven and 2005–06 KNVB Cup winners Ajax. Ajax won the match 3–1.

Match details

References

 

2006
Supercup
j
j
Johan Cruyff Shield